Nik Kapun (born 9 January 1994) is a Slovenian footballer who plays as a midfielder for Liepāja.

International career
Kapun got his first call up to the senior Slovenia squad for the UEFA Euro 2016 qualifiers against Switzerland and Estonia in September 2015.

Honours
Olimpija Ljubljana
Slovenian PrvaLiga: 2015–16, 2017–18
Slovenian Cup: 2017–18, 2018–19, 2020–21

References

External links
NZS profile 

1994 births
Living people
Footballers from Ljubljana
Slovenian footballers
Slovenian expatriate footballers
Association football midfielders
NK Olimpija Ljubljana (2005) players
FK Liepāja players
Slovenian PrvaLiga players
Latvian Higher League players
Slovenian expatriate sportspeople in Latvia
Expatriate footballers in Latvia
Slovenia under-21 international footballers